Glynn Andrew Tromans (born 1969), is a male former athlete who competed for Great Britain and England. 
Tromans won seventeen National and British titles on track, road and country, including a record of five CAU/UK Cross Country victories. He has coached international competitors in athletics, triathlon and the paralympic sport of Boccia. He is employed as a Performance Coach by the UK Boccia Federation.

Athletics career
He became the British champion in 2001 after winning the British 10,000 metres title.

He represented England in the 10,000 metres event, at the 1998 Commonwealth Games in Kuala Lumpur, Malaysia.

References

1969 births
Living people
English male long-distance runners
Athletes (track and field) at the 1998 Commonwealth Games
Commonwealth Games competitors for England